Thomas Kwame Yeboah (born 5 July 1959) is a Ghanaian politician and a member of the Second Parliament of the Fourth Republic representing the Dormaa West Constituency in the Brong Ahafo Region of Ghana.

Early life and education
Yeboah was born on 5 July 1959, in Dormaa West in the Brong Ahafo Region of Ghana. He attended the university University of Ghana and obtained his Bachelor of Arts after Studying Political Science with Sociology.

Politics
Yeaboah  was elected into the first parliament of the fourth republic of Ghana on 7 January 1993, after he was pronounced winner at the 1992 Ghanaian parliamentary election held on 29 December 1992. He was therefore re-elected into the second parliament of the fourth republic of Ghana on 7 January after he emerged winner at the 1996 Ghanaian general elections on the ticket of the National Democratic Congress for the Dormaa West Constituency in the Brong Ahafo Region of Ghana. He lost in the 2000 Ghanaian Elections to Yaw Asiedu-Mensah of the New Patriotic Party who polled 20,331 out of the 40,666 valid votes cast representing 49.92%.

References

1959 births
National Democratic Congress (Ghana) politicians
University of Ghana alumni
21st-century Ghanaian politicians
People from Brong-Ahafo Region
Ghanaian MPs 1997–2001
Living people
Ghanaian MPs 1993–1997